Scorpiothyrsus is a genus of flowering plants belonging to the family Melastomataceae.

Its native range is Southeastern China to Hainan.

Species:

Scorpiothyrsus erythrotrichus 
Scorpiothyrsus shangszeensis 
Scorpiothyrsus xanthostictus

References

Melastomataceae
Melastomataceae genera